The Moontrane is the third album led by trumpeter Woody Shaw which was recorded in 1974 and released on the Muse label. The Moontrane was released as part of Woody Shaw: The Complete Muse Sessions by Mosaic Records in 2013.

Reception 

Scott Yanow of Allmusic stated, "the adventurous music still sounds stimulating more than two decades later. Recommended".

Track listing 
All compositions by Woody Shaw except as indicated
 "The Moontrane" – 6:54
 "Sanyas" (Steve Turre) – 13:05
 "Tapscott's Blues" (Azar Lawrence) – 6:41
 "Katrina Ballerina" – 7:36
 "Are They Only Dreams?" (Onaje Allan Gumbs) – 9:12 Bonus track on CD reissue
 "Tapscott's Blues" [Alternate Take] (Lawrence) – 6:50 Bonus track on CD reissue
 "Katrina Ballerina" [Alternate Take] – 8:01 Bonus track on CD reissue

Personnel 
Woody Shaw – trumpet
Steve Turre – trombone
Azar Lawrence – tenor saxophone, soprano saxophone
Onaje Allan Gumbs – piano, electric piano
Cecil McBee (tracks 2–4 & 6–7), Buster Williams (tracks 1 & 5) – bass
Victor Lewis – drums
Guilherme Franco – percussion (tracks 2, 4–5 & 7), Tony Waters (tracks 2, 4–5 & 7) – percussion

References 

Woody Shaw albums
1975 albums
Muse Records albums
Albums produced by Michael Cuscuna
Instrumental albums